Dr. Sitasharan Sharma is an Indian politician, lawyer, and doctor. He served as the Speaker of the Madhya Pradesh Legislative Assembly (January 2014 -January 2019). He is the incumbent MLA from Narmadapuram (Vidhan Sabha constituency). He is a senior leader of Bharatiya Janata Party. It is his 5th term as MLA from the same constituency. He also served as the Chief Whip of the Bharatiya Janata Party Vidhaayak Dal in Madhya Pradesh Legislative Assembly from 1998 to 2003.

Education 
He has done MBBS from Gandhi Medical College, Bhopal and LLB from Narmada Mahavidyalaya, Narmadapuram.

Political career 
In Madhya Pradesh Legislative Assembly Election 2018, Dr. Sharma won against the Congress candidate Sartaj Singh with a margin of about 15000 votes.

Role as the Speaker of Madhya Pradesh Legislative Assembly 
Dr. Sharma ran the Madhya Pradesh Legislative Assembly for 4 years, 9 months from 2014 to 2019. He succeeded Ishwardas Rohani, who had been the speaker twice earlier. He took the oath in presence of then Madhya Pradesh Governor, Anandiben Patel.

Social work 
Dr. Sharma is actively involved in social work. Before entering the politics he used to run a clinic for the poor, who could consult free of cost. He also established a school in his constituency, for the purpose of providing quality education to students from the economically weaker sections of the society.

References 

Living people
Speakers of the Madhya Pradesh Legislative Assembly
Madhya Pradesh MLAs 1998–2003
Madhya Pradesh MLAs 2003–2008
People from Hoshangabad
Bharatiya Janata Party politicians from Madhya Pradesh
Year of birth missing (living people)